Strange Days were a British band based in York during the 1980s. Formerly known as The Sirens under which name they released one single: "Crusade" - B-side: "Close to Tears" - on their own label. A change of name to Strange Days saw them signed to local record label Powerstation Records, releasing the single "Within These Walls" with the b-side "Swimming Into The Doctor" in the mid-1980s. They appeared on Channel 4's music show The Tube in 1982 performing their self-penned 1980s anthem "Scream in Vain".

Band line-up
Lead vocals - Neale Jackson
Lead guitar - Steve Goodall
Bass - Dave Brassey
Drums - Dean Thackray
Keyboards - Simon Waggott (keyboard player, credited as Andy Tuck on The Sirens single "Crusade")
Steve Goodall (lead guitar) moved to Canada in the mid-1980s.

References

English rock music groups